Balasiong (also spelled balacion, baliciong, or balisiong) is a Filipino sword used by Muslim Filipino ethnolinguistic groups (the Moro people) in the Southern Philippines. It is a type of kalis but differs in that the double-edged blade isn't straight or wavy but instead slightly convex. It also tapers sharply to the tip. The hilt is slightly curved, an element known as the kakatua (cockatoo).

See also 
Kalis
Punyal
Kampilan
Panabas

References

Blade weapons
Filipino swords